

Location

The Cape Unicorns Polocrosse Club  is based at the Paarl Diamant equestrian school, situated next to the R44 (Western Cape) on the Western side of Paarl Mountain, within the Western Cape province of South Africa.

Affiliation

The club is affiliated to the Western Province Polocrosse Association, which is affiliated to the Polocrosse Association of South Africa (PASA).  The club is currently the biggest within the Western Province Polocrosse Association.

Achievements

2008
The Cape Unicorns A-Division team emerged as the winners of the 2008 South African Polocrosse Championships, where 39 teams from throughout South Africa competed at the Noodsberg Country Club in Kwazulu-Natal.

2007
Jan Albert Steenkamp represented the Cape Unicorns within the South African national team during the 2007 Polocrosse World Cup, held in Australia at Morgan Park in the city of Warwick, Queensland.

References

External links
 "Paarl Post - Crossing borders"
 "Polocrosse Worldwide - South African Polocrosse Clubs"

Sport in the Western Cape